Jia, King of Wei (died 225 BC?) was the last ruler of the state of Wei during the waning days of the Warring States Period of Chinese history. He ruled the kingdom between 227 BC and 225 BC.

Jia was the son of King Jingmin of Wei. He ascended the throne after his father's death. In 225 BC, a Qin army led by Wang Ben invaded Wei. Three months later, the city wall was destroyed, Jia had to surrender. His fate was not mentioned in the Records of the Grand Historian; however, according to Biographies of Exemplary Women and Zizhi Tongjian, he was executed by Qin army.

References

Monarchs of Wei (state)
3rd-century BC Chinese monarchs
Chinese kings